Mosquero can refer to:
Sallong, used on a horse
Mosquero, New Mexico

See also
Mosqueiro, an island in Brazil